Perfect Timing is a 1981 album by British singer Kiki Dee. The album marked a brief comeback for the singer, led by  the top 20 single "Star". It was her only album on Ariola Records and reached No.47 on the UK album charts. The title track was also released, peaking at No.66. Two further singles were released; "Midnight Flyer" and "Loving You is Sweeter Than Ever" (a duet with Elton John). The album was produced by Pip Williams.

The album was re-released on CD in 2008 with four bonus tracks - those included are "Give It Up", which had been released as a single in Japan in 1980 and was the B-side to "Star". Allmusic gave the album a highly positive review (despite it awarding it just two stars) saying that the album had "great substance" and was "a real gem worth hearing anytime and anyplace", while Record Collector magazine said that on the album "she sings like [a star], treating highly-produced numbers such as the title track, roadhouse raunchers such as 'Midnight Flyer' and a slowed-down 'Loving You Is Sweeter Than Ever' (duetting with her pal Elt) with soul and panache".

Opening track "Star" was later used as the opening theme for TV's Opportunity Knocks between 1987 and 1990. It was also used by Debenhams as part of their Christmas Advert 2018 with the tagline “do a bit of you know you did good”.

Among the musicians playing on this album are keyboardist Patrick Moraz of Yes and The Moody Blues and Steve Holley of Wings.

Track listing 
Side One
 "Star" (Doreen Chanter) – 3:18
 "Loving You Is Sweeter Than Ever" (duet with Elton John) – (Ivy Hunter, Stevie Wonder) – 5:05
 "Wild Eyes" (Chris Bradford) – 4:26
 "Twenty Four Hours" (Reid Kaelin, Gary Osborne, Kiki Dee) – 4:15 
 "Perfect Timing (It Will Be Precise)" (Kit Hain) – 5:45
Side Two
 "Midnight Flyer" (Doreen and Irene Chanter) – 3:30
 "There's a Need" (Erik Kaz, Kiki Dee) – 4:10
 "Another Break" (Pip Williams) – 4:23
 "Love is Just a Moment Away" (Teresa Straley, Eddy Brown) – 3:35
 "You Are My Hope in This World" (Bias Boshell) – 5:40

Bonus tracks
 "Give It Up" (Erik Kaz, Kiki Dee) – 4:15
 "Perfect Timing" (12" version) (Kit Hain) – 7:20
 "The Chase is Finally On" (Bias Boshell, Gary Osborne, Kiki Dee, Pip Williams) – 3:27
 "Love You Is Sweeter Than Ever" (Alternate Mix) (Ivy Hunter, Stevie Wonder) – 5:13

Personnel 
 Kiki Dee - lead vocals, guitar
 Pip Williams - guitar, production
 Gary Twigg - bass 
 Patrick Moraz - keyboards
 Bias Boshell - keyboards
 Steve Holley - drums 
 Bob Jenkins - drums 
 Frank Ricotti - percussion
Technical
 Gregg Jackman - recording engineer
 Phil Thornalley - recording and mixing engineer

References 

Ariola Records albums
Kiki Dee albums
1981 albums